Rolo (Reggiano:  or ) is a comune (municipality) in the Province of Reggio Emilia in the Italian region Emilia-Romagna, located about  northwest of Bologna and about  northeast of Reggio Emilia.

Rolo borders the following municipalities: Carpi, Fabbrico, Moglia, Novi di Modena, Reggiolo.

References

External links
 Official website

Cities and towns in Emilia-Romagna